An Imaginary Country is the fifth studio album by Canadian electronic music musician Tim Hecker, released on March 10, 2009, by Kranky. The album is available on either CD or 2×LP.

Reception

Initial critical response to An Imaginary Country was positive. At Metacritic, which assigns a normalized rating out of 100 to reviews from mainstream critics, the album has received an average score of 79, based on 11 reviews.

Track listing

References

2009 albums
Tim Hecker albums
Kranky albums